David M. Lampton (born 1946) is George and Sadie Hyman Professor and Director of China Studies Emeritus at the Johns Hopkins Paul H. Nitze School of Advanced International Studies (SAIS) and former Chairman of The Asia Foundation. He was president of the National Committee on United States-China Relations from 1988 to 1997. From May 1998 to May 2006 he also was affiliated with The Nixon Center (now the Center for the National Interest) as the founding director of its Chinese Studies Program. Prior to 1988, Dr. Lampton was founding director of the China Policy Program at the American Enterprise Institute and associate professor of political science at Ohio State University where he started his academic career in 1974. After serving as Oksenberg-Rohlen Fellow at Stanford University's Asia-Pacific Research Center (2019-2020), he returned to SAIS where he is Senior Research Fellow at the Foreign Policy Institute. In 2020, with co-authors Selina Ho and Cheng-Chwee Kuik, he published Rivers of Iron: Railroads and Chinese Power in Southeast Asia (University of California Press), on PRC high-speed rail construction in eight Southeast Asian states.

Lampton specializes in Chinese domestic politics, leadership, U.S.-China relations, and Chinese foreign policy.  He is the author of The Three Faces of Chinese Power: Might, Money, and Minds (2008), which won Honorable Mention in the Asia Society’s Bernard Schwartz Book Award competition for 2009. He received his B.A., M.A., and Ph.D. degrees from Stanford University. He has an honorary doctorate from the Russian Academy of Sciences’ Institute of Far Eastern Studies, is an Honorary Senior Fellow of the American Studies Institute of the Chinese Academy of Social Sciences, and was a Gilman Scholar at Johns Hopkins. On June 17, 2010, The National Bureau of Asian Research and the Woodrow Wilson International Center for Scholars awarded Lampton the inaugural Scalapino Prize, an award established in honor of Asia scholar Robert A. Scalapino. Presented at the 2010 Asia Policy Assembly in Washington, D.C., the award was given to Lampton in recognition of his contributions to America's understanding of the vast changes underway in Asia.  He is the recipient of a 2011 Rockefeller Foundation Bellagio "Residency Award." His book, Following the Leader: Ruling China, from Deng Xiaoping to Xi Jinping, was published in January 2014 and a second edition in 2020, both published by University of California Press.

Lampton is a member of the National Committee on U.S.-China Relations Executive Committee and a member of the Council on Foreign Relations. He served on the Board of Trustees of Colorado College from 1999 to 2013 and now is a Life Trustee.  He also serves on the Advisory Boards of the National Bureau of Asian Research and U.S.-China Education Trust.  He served as enlisted and commissioned officer of the U.S. Army Reserve, was a fireman at Stanford University, and is a member of Phi Beta Kappa and Phi Eta Sigma academic honorary societies.

On 27 February 2014, Lampton was part of a panel discussion sponsored by the US-Asia Institute entitled "Sino-Japan Dynamics and Implications for The U.S.-Japan Alliance." His May 2015 speech at The Carter Center is often cited as the earliest serious warning that U.S.-China relations were in serious decline--"The Tipping Point".

In January 2015 Lampton was named the most influential China watcher by the Institute of International Relations at the China Foreign Affairs University in Beijing. Researchers chose him after assessing the credentials of 158 China experts.

Bibliography
 Rivers of Iron: Railroads and Chinese Power in Southeast Asia, co-author (2020)
 Following the Leader: Ruling China, from Deng Xiaoping to Xi Jinping (2014; reprinted, with a new preface, 2019)
 The Three Faces of Chinese Power: Might, Money, and Minds (2008)
 Same Bed, Different Dreams: Managing U.S.-China Relations, 1989-2000 (2001)
 The Making of Chinese Foreign and Security Policy in the Era of Reform, editor (2001)
 United States and China Relations at a Crossroads, co-editor (1993)
 Bureaucracy, Politics and Decision-Making in Post-Mao China, co-editor (1992)
 China Global Presence, co-editor (1988)
 Policy Implementation in Post-Mao China, editor (1987)
 Paths to Power: Elite Mobility in Contemporary China (1986; reprinted in 1989)
 A Relationship Restored, co-author (1986)
 The Politics of Medicine in China, Health, Conflict and the Chinese Political System (1977)

Notes

External links 
Rockefeller Archives Center, Sleepy Hollow, New York. David M. Lampton's records as President of the National Committee on US-China Relations and his interviews with Chinese leaders  from the early 1970s into the 2020s.
Johns Hopkins SAIS Bio
"Promoting U.S. Interests in China: Alternatives to the Annual MFN Review," David M. Lampton, coauthor (NBR Analysis, July 1997)
"China in the Year 2020," David M. Lampton, coauthor (Asia Policy, July 2007)
"Andrew C. Mertha’s CHINA'S WATER WARRIORS: CITIZEN ACTION AND POLICY CHANGE," David M. Lampton, coauthor (Asia Policy, July 2009)
"Power Constrained: Sources of Mutual Strategic Suspicion in U.S.-China Relations" (NBR Analysis, June 2010)
"A New Type of Major-Power Relationship: Seeking a Durable Foundation for U.S.-China Ties," David M. Lampton (Asia Policy, July 2013)

David Lampton opinion pieces, South China Morning Post, https://muckrack.com/david-m-lampton/articles
Lampton content, National Committee on United States-China Relations, https://www.ncuscr.org/search?search=lampton
David "Mike" M. Lampton C-SPAN appearances, C-SPAN, https://www.c-span.org/person/?davidlampton

American political scientists
Johns Hopkins University faculty
American sinologists
1946 births
Living people
National Bureau of Asian Research